The Iowa Centennial half dollar was designed by Adam Pietz and minted in 1946. The reverse depicts the Iowa Old Capitol Building (also known as the "Old Stone Capitol") in Iowa City, and the obverse shows the state seal.

History
Since 1936, no new commemorative coins had been approved, as the many abuses and scandals involved with past commemorative coin issues had caused both Congress and then-president Franklin D. Roosevelt to oppose any bills for new commemoratives, especially after a Congressional hearing held on April 15, 1937. However, with Harry S. Truman in office, the state of Iowa was able to get the bill for the Iowa Centennial half dollar passed on August 7th, 1946. The bill authorized a minimum of 100,000 coins to be minted. Former mint engraver Adam Pietz was selected by Mint director Nellie Tayloe Ross to design and sculpt the coin.

The coins were sold by the Iowa Centennial Committee $2.50 for Iowans, and $3 for those outside of the state. The discounted price for Iowans came as a result of the committee wanting all Iowans to buy a coin if they wanted one. A majority of the coins minted were sold, with 500 pieces was set side for distribution in 1996, and 500 more for 2046. In 1996, the coins that were set aside for release that year were offered for $500 each in special holders.

See also
 Early United States commemorative coins
 Half dollar (United States coin)

References

External links
 

1946 in the United States
Currencies introduced in 1946
Eagles on coins
Early United States commemorative coins
Fifty-cent coins
Symbols of Iowa